Kara-Balta (lit. 'black ax', Russian and ) is a city and municipality on the Kara-Balta River, in Chüy Region, Kyrgyzstan, the capital of Jayyl District. It was founded in 1825 under the Kokand Khanate, and received city status in 1975 under the Soviets. Its population was 48,278 in 2021.

The road continues west through Kaindy toward Taraz, Kazakhstan. Another road goes south through the Töö-Ashuu Pass and then splits, one branch going west to Talas Province and the other south and then east through the Suusamyr valley to Balykchy on Lake Issyk Kul. It has a temperate climate. The terrain is flat, with a slight slope downwards from the south to the north.

The Chüy Valley has been settled since the 5th century, but after an invasion by Genghis Khan the area was inhabited mostly by nomads and pastoralists.  However, the settlement became a town and flourished under the Khanate of Kokand.

Population

Geography

Climate 
Kara-Balta has a hot, dry-summer continental climate (Köppen climate classification Dsa). The average annual temperature is 9.7 °C (49.5 °F). The warmest month is July with an average temperature of 23.3 °C (73.9 °F) and the coolest month is January with an average temperature of -4.8 °C (23.4 °F). The average annual precipitation is 414.1mm (16.3") and has an average of 99.2 days with precipitation. The wettest month is April with an average of 60.9mm (2.4") of precipitation and the driest month is August with an average of 12.2mm (0.5") of precipitation.

Economy
The major industry in Kara-Balta was the processing plant of the mining combine, Kara-Balta Ore Mining Combine (KBMP), the largest in Central Asia. During Soviet times, it processed uranium ore from deposits in Kyrgyzstan and Kazakhstan.  After independence, the mines in Kyrgyzstan closed quickly; however, KBMP continued to process uranium concentrate from Kazakhstan until 2005 when this activity was stopped due to a lack of raw material.  The massive uranium tailings remain a problem.  KBMP still processes gold and molybdenum ores.

In February 2007, the Russian Renova Group won a tender to purchase the Kyrgyz government's 72.28% stake in the Kara-Balta uranium-production facility.

Transport

Highways
Kara-Balta is located along M41 on the route from Bishkek to Osh. It is also connected by highway to Taraz, Kazakhstan.

Rail
Kara-Balta is connected by rail to Bishkek and Taraz, Kazakhstan.

Sports

During the Soviet period, the city had a good sport infrastructure.

The city has a bandy club.

Military

In the city the Russian military has a capacity.

References
This article is based in part on material from the Russian Wikipedia.

Populated places in Chüy Region